Hydrelia inornata, the unadorned carpet moth, is a moth in the family Geometridae. It is found in North America, including Indiana, Iowa, Kentucky, Maine, Maryland, Massachusetts, New Brunswick, New Hampshire, New York, North Carolina, Nova Scotia, Ohio, Ontario, Pennsylvania, Quebec, Saskatchewan, Tennessee and West Virginia.

The wingspan is about 15 mm.

References

Moths described in 1862
Asthenini
Moths of North America